Dichomeris asodes is a moth of the family Gelechiidae. It was described by Edward Meyrick in 1939. It is known from Java, Indonesia.

The larvae feed on "sogok tsenteng".

References

asodes
Moths described in 1939